Teapot Industries (also known as Teapot Industries Inc.) is an Italian indie rock band, formed in 2011 in Rome, Italy, by Andrea Lomuscio (Arcadetar, vocals, Theremin, synths) and Matilde Illiano (guitar, drums), known for its unusual custom-built instruments used during live performances.

History
The band name was inspired by Bertrand Russell's never published article titled "Is There a God?", commissioned by Illustrated magazine in 1952:

Band members
Official members

 Andrea Lomuscio – vocals, Arcadetar, keyboards, synthesizers, ThereminPi (2011–present)
 Matilde Illiano – drums, percussion, guitars (2012–present)

Instruments

During live shows the band uses custom-built instruments, like the Arcadetar and ThereminPi, designed by Teapot Industries themselves and other collaborators.
Andrea Lomuscio usually performs using a custom-built purple piano, the Arcadetar, and a pedalboard to trigger chords; being able to play a bass part, a chord pattern, a lead instrument and a vocal part contemporaneously. No pre-recorded sequences are used during live performances.

Musical style
Teapot Industries' sound has been described as a combination of various genres, including a psychedelic version of Jeff Buckley, the prog of Genesis and King Crimson, Pink Floyd, the ballads of Deep Purple, Empire of the Sun's synthpop, and Muse. 
The main peculiarity is the absence of a verse-chorus structure, with frequent key and tempo changes in the same song. This characteristic is directly taken from the 70's prog-rock, as mentioned before, but Teapot Industries go further corrupting the prog-rock sound with alternative and electronic ones, and always keeping the songs very short. It's not just a chance that Relligion Town contains many musical references, it is a pastiche and a programmatic piece that introduces the listener to Teapot Industries' music.

Lyrics
The Teapot Industries Corporation is obviously a reference to the authority and dominance of religions. The lyrics frequently deal with the awakening from dogmatic slumber, in particular He, Religion Town and Bertrand. Teapot Industries Inc. proposes itself as an handbook for this awakening.

Vieillesse Time is about a terminally ill man who spent all his money to fulfil his last wish: spending his last days in orbit. This is the first case of euthanasia in space. The American poet and painter Jonathan Clark realized a triptych based on Viellesse Time, interpreting the song as the end of the pain as a consequence of an ethereal vision. He exposed this work in a local hospital in Kentucky, USA as a form of Art-Therapy.

At the moment Teapot Industries have not released an official explanation of Bag and Baggage lyrics, so different interpretations are plausible.

Like to Be Alone, Pt.2 is about multiverse travels. If we could travel enough far, about  meters away, we could discover an entire universe identical to ours. In particular Like to Be Alone, Pt.2 is about having sex with your doppelgänger.

Use in media
Vieillesse Time has been used for an alternative version of the 6th season trailer of the TV series Skins.
Like to Be Alone, Pt. 2 and Vieillesse Time (Live) are part of the OST of Odyssey: On the Lands of Sam Neill directed by Matthieu Blomme in 2015
Carphology is included in the short movie Afterparty by Kieran Wall, while Vieillesse Time has been used for its trailer in 2016

Discography

Albums 
 2017: Teapot Industries Inc. (TripWire Records)
 Bertrand (Introduction) - 2:16
 Bertrand (Album Version) - 3:07
 Carphology (Album Version) - 5:27
 Like To Be Alone, Pt.2 - 3:35
 Vieillesse Time - 3:55
 Rob The Cradle - 3:47
 Bag and Baggage - 3:39
 Vieillesse Time (Live) - 6:48

EPs 
 2014: Teapot Industries Goes Live (Ware-Labs / AWAL)
 Like to Be Alone, Pt. 2 - 3:33
 Introduction - 0:58
 Rob the Cradle (Live) - 4:15
 He (Live) - 4:03
 Jesus' Money (Live) - 4:36
 Vieillesse Time (Live) - 6:48
 2011: Teapot Industries Inc. (2011 - Demo) (Ware-Labs / AWAL)
 He (Demo) - 2:43
 Rob the Cradle (Demo) - 3:17
 Religion Town (Demo) - 4:39
 Vieillesse Time (Demo) - 3:56
 Bag and Baggage (Demo) - 2:48

Singles 
2014: Vanessa Laino ft. Teapot Industries - Dioniso (Life Sentence Rec.)
2015: Teapot Industries - Bertrand (remixes) (Katana Sounds)
2016: Carphology (Katana Sounds) - Artwork by Mark Kostabi

Videos 
2015: Bertrand (Paki Palmieri Main Mix) - directed by Juan Behrens
2016: Carphology feat. Matthew Rubinstein - directed by Teapot Industries in collaboration with Mark Kostabi
2016: Bertrand (Album Version) - directed by Matthieu Blomme

References

External links
 Official Website
 

2011 establishments in Italy
Ableton Live users
Ambient music groups
Dream pop musical groups
Italian electronic music groups
Italian post-rock groups
Musical groups established in 2011
Italian musical duos
Shoegazing musical groups
Italian synthpop groups
Musical groups from Rome